Evelina Trojanska (15 November 1929 – 2000) was a Bulgarian chess player. She was awarded the title of Woman International Master (WIM) by FIDE in 1972.

Biography
In the 1960s and the 1970s, Evelina Trojanska was one of the leading Bulgarian female chess players. She won the Bulgarian women's championship in 1973.

Evelina Trojanska played for Bulgaria in the Women's Chess Olympiads:
 In 1966, a second board in the 3rd Women's Chess Olympiad in Oberhausen (+1, =1, -5),
 In 1969, a second board in the 4th Women's Chess Olympiad in Lublin (+4, =2, -1).

She was married to the Bulgarian writer Anton Donchev. She died in a car crash.

References

External links

Evelina Trojanska chess games at 365Chess.com

1929 births
2000 deaths
Chess Woman International Masters
Bulgarian female chess players
Chess Olympiad competitors
Road incident deaths in Bulgaria
Place of birth missing
Date of death missing
Place of death missing
20th-century chess players